La Tante DC10 Restaurant, known locally as The Green Plane, is a public–private partnership restaurant established in Accra. This operates from the defunct Ghana Airways McDonnell Douglas DC-10, which had been in operation as a passenger jet between 1983 and 2005. The restaurant serves staple Ghanaian dishes. The restaurant has been well received locally.

Description
La Tante DC10 Restaurant is a restaurant located inside a converted McDonnell Douglas DC-10 formerly used by the defunct Ghana Airways. Formerly flying 380 passengers, it has been converted into a 118-seat restaurant with large numbers of the seats removed in order to provide adequate space for patrons and for the installation of dining tables. An annex was attached to the right side of the fuselage to accommodate the kitchen.

The airplane itself has been moved to Airport City Accra, a suburb of Accra near to Kotoka International Airport and opposite Marina Mall Accra, with people entering and exiting the plane/restaurant via a covered staircase from ground level. They enter through the former first class seating area, which has been converted into a waiting area. Separate bathrooms have been installed for male and female diners and the restaurant is air-conditioned throughout.

Menu
The restaurant serves Ghanaian cuisine. These include staples such as spiced tilapia, served with banku, a type of maize-based porridge. Other dishes include Jollof rice with chicken, and "red red" black-eyed pea stew with fish. While the prices at La Tante DC10 Restaurant are higher than those normally seen in the local area, the restaurant prices itself lower than the upmarket restaurants elsewhere in Accra.

History

The DC-10 used as the restaurant was formerly owned and operated by Ghana Airways on routes between Ghana and both Europe and the United States. Ghana Airways ordered a DC-10-30 in 1976, with it arriving on 24 February 1983. During July 1985, it was used to fly United Nations troops in and out of Beirut, Lebanon. In January the following year the plane was used under contract from Caribbean Airlines to fly passengers from Europe to the Caribbean twice weekly.

In June 2002, the plane was impounded at London Heathrow Airport, United Kingdom, following unpaid debts of £4 million owned by the national carrier to parts supplier AJ Walters Aviation, causing services between Accra, the UK and Italy to be temporarily suspended. The airline went bankrupt in 2005. Following this, the plane was abandoned and left at Kotoka Airport; over the course of the following years, various parts were sold for scrap, including the three engines.

At the time it was purchased by the wife of the Togolese Minister in 2011, there had been preparations to salvage the plane for its aluminium. The plane was converted and re-opened as a restaurant on 11 November 2013 as a public-private partnership between the Ghana Airport Company Limited and Vindira Company Limited. It is the first time that a plane based restaurant has opened in Africa.

Reception
The restaurant has proved popular with diners; manager Indira Shiyam explained in an interview with BBC News in 2014 that "At first, people wanted to have a feel of restaurant in a plane but surprisingly they keep coming". Some of the diners eat in the restaurant because they have never been inside a plane before, while others were curious about eating in a plane based restaurant.

Ask the Pilot columnist Patrick Smith visited the restaurant in 2016; his review was later published in Business Insider. He said it was cheap and good, but not exceptional. He criticised the "lack of context" given to the restaurant, as he would have enjoyed seeing photos of the plane when it was in use as a passenger jet. Smith said "Many restaurants have long and storied histories, but usually just in one place! Here's a restaurant that has literally been everywhere."

Notes

References

External links

Accra
Companies based in Accra
Ghanaian companies established in 2013
Individual aircraft
Restaurants established in 2013
Restaurants in Ghana
2013 establishments in Ghana